Chelsea Aubry (born June 27, 1984) is a Canadian professional basketball player from Kitchener, Ontario. She plays for the Canadian women's national basketball team. She has competed in the 2012 Summer Olympics. She has played for Bendigo Spirit.

References

1984 births
Living people
Basketball people from Ontario
Basketball players at the 2012 Summer Olympics
Canadian expatriate basketball people in Australia
Canadian women's basketball players
Olympic basketball players of Canada
Sportspeople from Kitchener, Ontario